Dead Blonde, is a Russian rave solo band lead by Arina Nikolaevna Bulanova (born 6 April 1999, Arkhangelsk, Russia). The band gained notoriety with the songs "Мальчик на девятке" (Boy on a Nine) and  "Бесприданница" (Dowry), which became popular on Russian TikTok.

Early life 
Arina was born on 6 April 1999 in Arkhangelsk, but grew up in Solombala. She studied at the Academy of the Investigative Committee in St. Petersburg, but left to pursue her musical career.

Career 
Initially, Arina was the producer of the rave project GSPD. Currently with this, she is a backing vocalist and DJ at their concerts.

On 7 January 2020, David Deimour of GSPD and Arina launched the Dead Blonde rave project. On 30 April of the same year, her debut studio album "PROPAGANDA" was released. This album included the single "Back to School" which was released on 14 February.

On 25 September 2020, the single "Between Panel Houses", and on 6 October, a remix of the song by Hotzzen was released.

In late April to early May 2021, the song "Boy on a Nine" became popular on TikTok in Russia. This was followed by the song hitting the charts on YouTube, iTunes, Apple Music and Spotify. On 18 May, a remix of the same song by GSPD was released.

On 2 July 2021, her second album "Princess from Khrushchev" was released. And at the end of October of the same year, she gave her first solo concerts in Moscow and St. Petersburg.

Personal life 
She is married to David Deimour of GSPD.

Discography

Studio albums

Singles

Awards and nominations

References

External links 
 Youtube
 Spotify
 Apple Music
 Deezer
 Instagram
 VK

21st-century Russian women singers
21st-century Russian singers
Rave music
1999 births
Living people
People from Arkhangelsk
Russian YouTubers
Music YouTubers
Russian activists against the 2022 Russian invasion of Ukraine